Bononi is a surname. Notable people with the surname include:

Carlo Bononi (1569?–1632), Italian painter
Lionello Bononi, Italian baroque period painter
Bartolommeo Bononi (active 1491–1528), Italian renaissance painter
 

Italian-language surnames